Thout 20 - Coptic Calendar - Thout 22

The twenty-first day of the Coptic month of Thout, the first month of the Coptic year. On a common year, this day corresponds to September 18, of the Julian Calendar, and October 1, of the Gregorian Calendar. This day falls in the Coptic season of Akhet, the season of inundation.

Commemorations

Feasts 

 Monthly commemoration of the Virgin Mary, the Theotokos

Saints 

 The martyrdom of Saint Cyprian the Bishop and Saint Justina

References 

Days of the Coptic calendar